Lawrence Roberts was a Scottish footballer who played as a centre forward. He played local football for Renton before joining Football League First Division side Burnley in February 1920. Roberts made his debut for on 14 February 1920 in the 2–0 win over Manchester City, but was replaced by James Twiss for the following match against Sheffield Wednesday. He subsequently returned to Scotland, signing for Hamilton Academical in the Scottish Football League later the same month.

References

Scottish footballers
Association football forwards
Burnley F.C. players
Hamilton Academical F.C. players
English Football League players
Scottish Football League players
Renton F.C. players
Year of birth missing
Year of death missing